An equestrian statue of Antonio Aguilar is installed in Los Angeles' El Pueblo de Los Ángeles Historical Monument, in the U.S. state of California. The statue is located on the corner of Los Angeles Street and Alameda Street, in front of the city's Union Station.

References 

El Pueblo de Los Ángeles Historical Monument
Equestrian statues in California
Monuments and memorials in California
Outdoor sculptures in Greater Los Angeles
Sculptures of men in California
Statues in Los Angeles